Sebastian Selin (born February 9, 1992) is a Swedish professional ice hockey forward. He is currently playing under contract with Sparta Warriors of the Eliteserien.

Selin made his Elitserien debut playing with Skellefteå AIK during the 2012–13 Elitserien season.

References

External links

1992 births
Living people
Swedish ice hockey right wingers
People from Skellefteå Municipality
Sportspeople from Västerbotten County
Skellefteå AIK players
Piteå HC players
IF Sundsvall Hockey players
Almtuna IS players
IK Pantern players
IF Björklöven players
Sparta Warriors players
Swedish expatriate ice hockey players in Norway
Swedish Hockey League players